Christian William Gammelgaard Grøndal (born 10 March 2003) is a Danish professional footballer who plays as a right winger for Danish Superliga club Vejle Boldklub.

Career

Vejle
Gammelgaard is a product of the Vejle Boldklub academy. In March 2021, Gammelgaard signed a new contract with Vejle until June 2022.

Gammelgaard got his official debut for Vejle on 22 October 2021 in a Danish Superliga game against FC Nordsjælland, where he came in from the bench to the last couple of minutes. On 26 January 2022 Vejle confirmed, that Gamelgaard had signed a new two-year deal running from the summer 2022, which also secured him a promotion to the first team squad.

Personal life
Christian Gammelgaard is the son of former Danish footballer Niels Ejnar Gammelgaard, who also played for Vejle Boldklub between 1993 and 1996.

References

External links

2003 births
Living people
Danish men's footballers
Association football wingers
Danish Superliga players
Vejle Boldklub players
People from Vejle Municipality
Sportspeople from the Region of Southern Denmark